Sagittarians may refer to:
Sagittarian, a person born under the astrological sign Sagittarius
Sagittarians, a fictional Marvel Comics alien race

See also
Sagittaria, a genus of aquatic plants
Sagittarius (disambiguation)